Boccia is a surname. Notable people with the surname include:

Edward Boccia (1921–2012), American painter and poet
Ferdinand Boccia (1900–1934), American mobster
Francesco Boccia (born 1968), Italian academic and politician
Tanio Boccia (1912–1982), Italian film director and screenwriter